North Korea has conducted six nuclear tests, in 2006, 2009, 2013, twice in 2016, and in 2017.


Testing

Summary

See also
 North Korea and weapons of mass destruction

References

Sources